The canton of Ploërmel is an administrative division of the Morbihan department, northwestern France. Its borders were modified at the French canton reorganisation which came into effect in March 2015. Its seat is in Ploërmel.

It consists of the following communes:
 
Brignac
Campénéac
Concoret
La Croix-Helléan
Cruguel
Évriguet
Forges de Lanouée
Gourhel
La Grée-Saint-Laurent
Guégon
Guillac
Guilliers
Helléan
Josselin
Lantillac
Loyat
Mauron
Ménéac
Mohon
Montertelot
Néant-sur-Yvel
Ploërmel
Saint-Brieuc-de-Mauron
Saint-Léry
Saint-Malo-des-Trois-Fontaines
Saint-Servant
Taupont
Tréhorenteuc
La Trinité-Porhoët

References

Cantons of Morbihan